Six Ashes is a small village in Shropshire, England, on the Shropshire side of the border with Staffordshire.

See also
Tripartite Indenture

Notes

External links

Villages in Shropshire